Menefee is a surname. Notable people with the surname include:

Curt Menefee (born 1965), American sports announcer
David Menefee, American writer
Jock Menefee (1868–1953), American baseball player
Richard Menefee (1809–1841), American politician

See also
Menefee Peak, mountain in Colorado, United States
Menefee Formation, geological formation
Menefee Shale, geological stratum